Milleria is a genus of flowering plants in the tribe Millerieae within the family Asteraceae.

 Species
 Milleria perfoliata B.L.Turner - Jalisco
 Milleria quinqueflora L. - widespread from Chihuahua to Ecuador
 formerly included
see Delilia Flaveria 
 Milleria biflora L. - Delilia biflora (L.) Kuntze
 Milleria chiloensis Ruiz & Pavón ex Juss. - Flaveria bidentis (L.) Kuntze
 Milleria contrayerba Cav. - Flaveria bidentis (L.) Kuntze

References

Millerieae
Asteraceae genera